James Cutting may refer to:

 James Ambrose Cutting (1814–1867), American photographer and inventor
 James E. Cutting, American cognitive scientist, researcher, and professor